Boulevard René-Lévesque may refer to:
 René Lévesque Boulevard, in Montreal
 Boulevard René-Lévesque (Quebec City)
 René Lévesque Boulevard (Laval)